Attinella concolor is a species of jumping spider in the family Salticidae. It is found in the United States and Mexico.

It was first described in 1895 by N. Banks.

References

External links
 

Sitticini
Articles created by Qbugbot
Spiders described in 1895